Karol Danielak (born 29 September 1991) is a Polish professional footballer who plays as a winger or attacking midfielder for Wieczysta Kraków.

Career

Arka Gdynia
In February 2019, Danielak was demoted to the reserve team of Arka Gdynia and was told to find a new club.

Podbeskidzie
On 12 June 2019 Podbeskidzie Bielsko-Biała confirmed, that Danielak had joined the club on a two-year contract. He left the club at the end of his contract.

Widzew Łódź
On 2 July 2021, Danielak signed a two-year contract with Widzew Łódź. Having been put on the transfer list in late November 2022, on 9 December that year he mutually agreed to leave the club.

Wieczysta Kraków
On 20 December 2022, Danielak joined fourth division side Wieczysta Kraków on a deal until June 2025.

Honours

Club
Arka Gdynia
 Polish Super Cup: 2018

References

External links
Karol Danielak at Podbeskidzie's website

Polish footballers
1991 births
Living people
Jarota Jarocin players
Chrobry Głogów players
Pogoń Szczecin players
Zawisza Bydgoszcz players
Arka Gdynia players
Podbeskidzie Bielsko-Biała players
Widzew Łódź players
Wieczysta Kraków players
Ekstraklasa players
I liga players
II liga players
Association football midfielders
People from Jarocin